Serine/threonine-protein phosphatase 2B catalytic subunit beta isoform (PP2BB) is an enzyme that in humans is encoded by the PPP3CB gene.

References

Further reading